Eliott's Practice Battery is an artillery battery in the British Overseas Territory of Gibraltar.

References

Batteries in Gibraltar